Fried My Little Brains is the second single of UK based Indie rock band The Kills' debut album Keep on Your Mean Side and it peaked at number 55 in the UK Singles Chart.

Track listing

Personnel
Alison "VV" Mosshart – Lead vocals, guitar
Jamie "Hotel" Hince – Guitar, Drum machine

Charts

References

2003 singles
The Kills songs